Mataragka (also Mataranga) is a Greek village in the municipal unit of Larissos, Achaea, Greece. It is located on the western edge of the Movri hills, 4 km south of Riolos, 5 km east of Neapoli and 34 km southwest of Patras. In 2011 Mataragka had a population of 117 for the village and 282 for the municipal district, which includes the village Kefalaiika. Until 1974, Mataragka was part of the Elis Prefecture.

Population

See also
List of settlements in Achaea

External links
Website of the municipality of Larissos

References

Populated places in Achaea